Thomalla and Tomalla are surnames of Polish origin, Germanized forms of the Polish-language surname Tomala. Notable people with the surname include:

Denis Thomalla (born 1992), German footballer
Georg Thomalla (1915–1999), German actor
Hans Thomalla (born 1975), German composer
Richard Thomalla (1903–1945), Nazi SS officer and Holocaust perpetrator, executed for war crimes
Simone Thomalla (born 1965), German actress
Walter Tomalla, founder of the Tomalla Foundation

See also
 
 
 Tomala (surname)

References

German-language surnames
Polish-language surnames
Surnames of Polish origin
Patronymic surnames